Thatha Khairo Matmal  is a village located on Lahore Sargodha road Pindi Bhattian .It is just 6 km from Pindi Bhattian city on Lahore road.

Its educational institutes include two Govt. High Schools one for males and the other for females, and some private institutions providing different levels education. Its Health facilities include one Basic Health Unit & one Veterinary  Hospital.

It is the village of ex-MPA Sardar Muhammad Rafique Gujjar.

There are two rice husking factories; Diamond Rice Mills and Sandal Rice Mills.

Hafizabad District
Villages in Hafizabad District